The ancient Egyptian Water-jugs-in-stand hieroglyph, is Gardiner sign listed no. W17, W18, within the Gardiner signs for vessels of stone and earthenware.

The hieroglyph is used as an ideogram in (kh)nt-(ḫnt), for 'a stand (for vases)'. It is also used phonetically for (ḫnt).

Egyptian "khenti"
The water-jugs-in-stand hieroglyph is often written with the complement of three other hieroglyphs, the water ripple, N35, bread bun, X1, and two strokes, Z4, to make the Egyptian language word foremost, khenti. The complete composition block is: W17-N35:X1*Z4

As Egyptian "khenti", foremost is used extensively to refer to gods, often in charge of a region, or position, as foremost of xxxx. Anubis, or Osiris are often referred to as "Foremost", or "Chief" of the 'western cemetery', (where the sun sets).

See also
Gardiner's Sign List#W. Vessels of Stone and Earthenware
Smiting-blade symbol (hieroglyph)

References

Betrò, 1995. Hieroglyphics: The Writings of Ancient Egypt, Maria Carmela Betrò, c. 1995, 1996-(English), Abbeville Press Publishers, New York, London, Paris (hardcover)
Budge.  An Egyptian Hieroglyphic Dictionary, E. A. Wallis Budge, (Dover Publications), c 1978, (c 1920), Dover edition, 1978. (In two volumes) (softcover)

Egyptian hieroglyphs: vessels of stone and earthenware